The Strait of Magellan, also called the Straits of Magellan, is a navigable sea route in southern Chile separating mainland South America to the north and Tierra del Fuego to the south. The strait is considered the most important natural passage between the Atlantic and Pacific oceans. It was discovered and first traversed by the Spanish expedition of Ferdinand Magellan in 1520, after whom it is named. Prior to this, the strait had been navigated by canoe-faring indigenous peoples including the Kawésqar.

Magellan's original name for the strait was Estrecho de Todos los Santos ("Strait of All Saints"). The King of Spain, Emperor Charles V, who sponsored the Magellan-Elcano expedition, changed the name to the Strait of Magellan in honor of Magellan.

The route is difficult to navigate due to frequent narrows and unpredictable winds and currents. Maritime piloting is now compulsory. The strait is shorter and more sheltered than the Drake Passage, the often stormy open sea route around Cape Horn, which is beset by frequent gale-force winds and icebergs. Along with the Beagle Channel, the strait was one of the few sea routes between the Atlantic and Pacific before the construction of the Panama Canal.

History

Pre-history
Land adjacent to the Strait of Magellan has been inhabited by indigenous Americans for thousands of years. Paleo-Indians near the strait are thought to have hunted American horses and Mylodons. Guanacos and huemules were possibly also hunted.

Historically identifiable indigenous ethnic groups around the strait are the Kawésqar, the Tehuelche, the Selk'nam and Yaghan people. The Kawésqar lived on the western part of the strait's northern coast. To the east of the Kawésqar were the Tehuelche, whose territory extended to the north in Patagonia. To the south of the Tehuelche across the strait lived the Selk'nam, who inhabited the majority of the eastern portion of Tierra del Fuego. To the west of the Selk'nam were the Yaghan people, who inhabited the southernmost part of Tierra del Fuego.

All tribes in the area were nomadic hunter-gatherers. The Tehuelche were the only non-maritime culture in the area; they fished and gathered shellfish along the coast during the winter and moved into the southern Andes in the summer to hunt. The tribes of the region saw little European contact until the late 19th century. Later, European-introduced diseases decimated portions of the indigenous population.

It is possible that Tierra del Fuego was connected to the mainland in the Early Holocene (c. 9000 years BP) much in the same way that Riesco Island was back then. A Selk'nam tradition recorded by the Salesian missionary Giuseppe María Beauvoir relate that the Selk'nam arrived in Tierra del Fuego by land, and that the Selk'nam were later unable to return north as the sea had flooded their crossing. Selknam migration to Tierra del Fuego is generally thought to have displaced a related non-seafaring people, the Haush that once occupied most of the main island. The Selk'nam, Haush, and Tehuelche are generally thought to be culturally and linguistically related peoples physically distinct from the sea-faring peoples.

According to a Selk'nam myth the strait was created along with the Beagle Channel and Fagnano Lake by slingshots falling on Earth during the fight of Taiyín with a witch who was said to have "retained the waters and the foods".

Magellan

The first European contact in this area was evidently the voyage of Ferdinand Magellan. (A report by António Galvão in 1563 that mentions early charts showing the strait as "Dragon's Tail" has led to speculation that there might have been earlier contact, but this is generally discounted.)

Magellan led an expedition in the service of the Spanish King, Emperor Charles V, to reach the Spice Islands. His ships became the first to navigate the strait in 1520. The five ships included La Trinidad (110 tons, 55 crew members), under the command of Magellan; La San Antonio (120 tons, 60 crew members) under the command of Juan de Cartagena; La Concepción (90 tons, 45 crew members) under the command of Gaspar de Quezada (Juan Sebastián Elcano served as boatswain); La Victoria (85 tons, 42 crew members) under the command of Luis de Mendoza; and La Santiago (75 tons, 32 crew members), under command of Juan Rodríguez Serrano (João Rodrigues Serrão). Before the passage of the strait (and after the mutiny in Puerto San Julián), Álvaro de Mesquita became captain of the San Antonio, and Duarte Barbosa of the Victoria. Later, Serrão became captain of the Concepcion (the Santiago, sent on a mission to find the passage, was caught in a storm and wrecked). San Antonio, charged to explore Magdalen Sound, failed to return to the fleet, instead sailing back to Spain under Estêvão Gomes, who imprisoned the captain Mesquita.

Magellan's ships entered the strait on All Saints' Day, 1 November 1520. Magellan named the strait Estrecho de Todos los Santos ("Strait of All Saints") and 
planted a flag to claim the land on behalf of the King of Spain. Magellan's chronicler, Antonio Pigafetta, called it the Patagonian Strait, and others Victoria Strait, commemorating the first ship that entered. Within seven years, it was being called Estrecho de Magallanes in honor of Magellan. The Spanish Empire and the Captaincy General of Chile considered the strait the southern boundary of their territory.

16th century explorations after Magellan

In the 1530s Charles V divided South America and whatever was to be south of it into a series of grants to different conquistadors. The strait of Magellan and the area south of it went to Pedro Sánchez de la Hoz.

Pedro de Valdivia, the conquistador of Chile, managed to have Charles V extend his governorship all the way to the northern shores of the strait. Meanwhile, Sánchez de la Hoz was executed in Chile by Francisco de Villagra, one of Valdivia's men.

The first map of the Pacific Ocean, Maris Pacifici from 1589, depicts the strait as the only route between the Atlantic and Pacific oceans.

The strait and the conquest of Chile

Contemporaries differed in their estimation of the strait's significance. In Europe it was viewed by some as an opportunity and a strategic location to facilitate long-range trade, though Antonio Pigafetta seemed to have understood his voyage through the area as an unrepeatable feat. By contrast, conquistador Pedro de Valdivia, in a letter to Charles V, considered the strait a threat through which rival conquistadors could arrive to challenge his claims.

In 1544 Valdivia commissioned Captain Juan Bautista Pastene to explore the coast from Valparaiso to the Strait of Magellan, and installed his personal secretary Juan de Cárdenas in the expedition to produce a written account of the lands discovered in order to solidify his claims before the King. Although Pastene's expedition reached only the 41st parallel south, well short of the strait, it discovered San Pedro Bay and the mouth of Valdivia River, where Valdivia would later found the city that bears his name. As Valdivia consolidated his claims, he mentions in a 1548 letter to the Council of the Indies the possibility of establishing contacts between Chile and Seville through the strait.

García Jofré de Loaiza was the second captain to navigate the strait and the first to discover that Tierra del Fuego was an island. Valdivia then dispatched Francisco de Ulloa to survey and explore the strait, facilitating navigation from Spain to Chile. In October 1553, Ulloa sailed from the city of Valdivia in the first expedition to enter the strait from the west. Ulloa reached Woods Bay, but faced with the steep coastline and lack of provisions and fearing entrapment in the strait during the winter, he turned around, returning to Chilean ports in February 1554.

Valdivia himself never actually reached the strait, as he was killed in 1553 attempting to conquer Araucanía, about 1600 km (994 miles) north of the strait.

In October 1557, Governor García Hurtado de Mendoza sent another exploratory squad of 70 men under the command of Juan Ladrillero. They were charged with mapping the coastline and surveying the region's flora, fauna, and ethnography. On August 16, 1558, Ladrillero arrived in the Atlantic Ocean, becoming the first navigator to cross the Strait of Magellan in both directions.

Colonization by the Spanish southward in Chile halted after the conquest of the Chiloé Archipelago in 1567. The Spanish are thought to have lacked incentives for further conquests south. The indigenous populations were sparse and did not engage in the sedentary agricultural life of the Spanish. The harsh climate in the fjords and channels of Patagonia may also have deterred further expansion. Even in Chiloé the Spanish encountered difficulties, having to abandon their initial economic model based on gold mining and "hispanic-mediterranean" agriculture.

Spanish attempt to colonise the strait

In 1578 English navigator Francis Drake crossed the strait, creating fear on the Pacific coast that an attack was imminent. In order to seal the passage, the Viceroy of Peru, Francisco de Toledo, sent a squadron with two ships under Pedro Sarmiento de Gamboa. They carefully explored the strait, trying to ferret out English invaders, while surveying locations for future fortifications.

Pigafetta had described the strait as a hospitable area with many good ports, "cedar" wood, and abundant shellfish and fish.

In 1584, Sarmiento de Gamboa founded two colonies in the strait: Nombre de Jesús and Ciudad del Rey Don Felipe. The latter was established on the north shore of the strait with 300 settlers. That winter, it became known as Puerto del Hambre, or "Port Famine", as most of the settlers died of cold or starvation. When Sir Thomas Cavendish landed at the site of Rey Don Felipe in 1587, he found only ruins of the settlement.

The Spanish failure to colonize the Strait of Magellan made the Chiloé Archipelago key in protecting western Patagonia from foreign intrusions. Valdivia, reestablished in 1645, and Chiloé acted as sentries, and as hubs where the Spanish collected intelligence from all over Patagonia.

In 1599 it took five ships under Simon de Cordes and his pilot William Adams four months to traverse the strait; Sebalt de Weert returned before reaching the end.

17th century explorations

In 1616, Dutch travelers, including Willem Schouten and Jacob Le Maire, discovered Cape Horn and recognized the southern end of Tierra del Fuego. Years later, a Spanish expedition commanded by brothers Bartolomé and Gonzalo Nodal verified this discovery making in the way also the first circumnavigation of Tierra del Fuego. After this there would be 150 years before the next ship from Spain would traverse the strait. By 1620, one hundred years after European discovery, at least 55 ships had traversed the strait including 23 Spanish, 17 English and 15 Dutch.

John Narborough's 1670 explorations in Patagonia caused the Spanish to launch various maritime expeditions to western Patagonia from 1674 to 1676. In the last and largest one, Pascual de Iriate led a party to Evangelistas Islets at the western entrance to the strait. At Evangelistas sixteen men of the party disappeared on February 17 including the son of Pascual de Iriarte. The ill-fated men had attempted to reach one of the islets to install a metal plaque indicating the King of Spain's ownership of the territory. Viceroy of Peru Baltasar de la Cueva issued orders to the governments of Chile, Chiloé and Río de la Plata to inquire about the men who disappeared at Evangelistas Islets. However no information about their fate came forth and it is presumed that the boat wrecked in the same storm that forced the remaining party to leave the area. Overall a total of 16–17 men perished in it. While by 1676 rumours about English bases in Western Patagonia had been dispelled, that year new rumours appeared claiming that England was preparing an expedition to settle the Straits of Magellan. The focus of Spanish attention to repel tentative English settlements shifted from the Pacific coast of Patagonia to the Straits of Magellan and Tierra del Fuego. Such a change, from the western archipelagoes to the strait, meant that any English settlement could be approached by Spain by land from the north, which was not the case for the islands in western Patagonia.

In February 1696, the first French expedition under the command of M. de Gennes reached the Strait of Magellan. The expedition is described by the French explorer, engineer, and hydrographer  in his A Relation of a Voyage (1699).

18th century explorations
In the 18th century further explorations were done by English explorers John Byron and James Cook. The French sent Louis Antoine de Bougainville and Jules Dumont d'Urville. By 1770 the focus of a potential conflict between Spain and Britain had shifted from the strait to Falkland Islands.

19th century

Explorations
From 1826 to 1830, the strait was explored and thoroughly charted by Phillip Parker King, who commanded the British survey vessel HMS Adventure. In consort with HMS Beagle, King surveyed the complex coasts around the strait. A report on the survey was presented at two meetings of the Geographical Society of London in 1831. In connection to these explorations Robert FitzRoy came to suggest the establishment of a British base in strait to aid travel between the British Isles and Australia.

The 1837 French expedition of Dumont D'Urville surveyed the area of Puerto del Hambre and the navigational conditions in the Strait of Magellan. In a report the expedition recommended that a French colony be established at the strait to support future traffic along the route.

Richard Charles Mayne commanded HMS Nassau on a survey expedition to the strait from 1866 to 1869. The naturalist on the voyage was Robert Oliver Cunningham. Charles Darwin requested the Lords of the Admiralty to ask Mayne to collect several boatloads of fossils of extinct quadruped species. Admiral Sulivan had previously discovered an astonishingly rich accumulation of fossil bones not far from the strait. These remains apparently belonged to a more ancient period than collections made by Darwin on HMS Beagle and other naturalists, and therefore were of great scientific interest. Many of these fossils were collected with the aid of hydrographer Richards R. N. and deposited in the British Museum. The Admiralty compiled advice to mariners of the strait in 1871.

Incorporation into Chile

Chile took possession of the Strait of Magellan on May 23, 1843. President Manuel Bulnes ordered this expedition after consulting the Chilean libertador Bernardo O'Higgins, who feared an occupation by Great Britain or France. The first Chilean settlement, Fuerte Bulnes, was situated in a forested zone on the north side of the strait, and was later abandoned. In 1848, Punta Arenas was founded farther north, where the Magellanic forests meet the Patagonian plains. In Tierra del Fuego, across the strait from Punta Arenas, the village of Porvenir emerged during the Tierra del Fuego gold rush in the late 19th century. Until the opening of the Panama Canal, the town was an important supply stop for mariners. It has been claimed that Chile's annexation of the area originated from a fear of occupation by Great Britain or France.

In the Boundary treaty of 1881 between Chile and Argentina, Argentina effectively recognized Chilean sovereignty over the Strait of Magellan. Argentina had previously claimed all of the strait, or at least the eastern third of it.

In the Treaty of Peace and Friendship of 1984 between Chile and Argentina the conflicts between two countries were settled and Argentina ratified the strait as Chilean.

Steamship navigation
In 1840, the Pacific Steam Navigation Company became the first to use steamships for commercial traffic in the strait. Until the Panama Canal opened in 1914, the Strait of Magellan was the main route for steamships traveling from the Atlantic Ocean to the Pacific. It was often considered safer than the Drake Passage separating Cape Horn from Antarctica, as the Drake Passage is notorious for turbulent and unpredictable weather, and is frequented by icebergs and sea ice. Ships in the strait, protected by Tierra del Fuego to the south and the coast of continental South America to the north, crossed with relative ease, and Punta Arenas became a primary refueling port that provided coal for steamships in transit. The Strait’s curving channel, with widths varying between 1.9 and 22 miles (3 to 35 kms), experiences unpredictable winds and tidal currents, leading sailing ships to prefer the Drake Passage, where they had more room to maneuver.)

Features

The northwestern portion of the strait is connected with other sheltered waterways via the Smyth Channel. This area is similar to the Inside Passage of Alaska. South of Cape Froward, the principal shipping route follows the Magdalena Channel. The climate is generally foggy and cold, and the course is convoluted with several narrow passages. It is several hundred miles shorter than the Drake Passage, but sailing ships, particularly clipper ships, prefer the latter. Its major port is Punta Arenas, a transshipment point for Chilean mutton situated on the Brunswick Peninsula. Exemplifying the difficulty of the passage, it took Magellan 38 days to complete the crossing.

The eastern opening is a wide bay on the border of Chile and Argentina between Punta Dúngeness on the mainland and Cabo del Espíritu Santo ("Cape of the Holy Spirit") on Tierra del Fuego, the border as defined in the Treaty of Peace and Friendship of 1984 between Chile and Argentina. Immediately west are Primera Angostura and Segunda Angostura, narrows formed by two terminal moraines of different ages. The Primera Angostura is the closest approach of Isla Grande de Tierra del Fuego to mainland South America. Farther west lies Magdalena Island, part of Los Pingüinos Natural Monument. The strait's southern boundary in the east follows first the shoreline of the Isla Grande de Tierra del Fuego, then the northern end of the Canal Whiteside and the shoreline of Dawson Island.

The western part of the strait leads northwest from the northern end of the Magdalena Channel to the strait's Pacific entrance. This is flanked on the south by Capitán Aracena Island, Clarence Island, Santa Inés Island, Desolación Island (Cabo Pilar), and other smaller islands, and on the north by Brunswick Peninsula, Riesco Island, Muñoz Gamero Peninsula, Manuel Rodriguez Island, and other minor islands of the Queen Adelaide Archipelago. Two narrow channels connect the strait with Seno Otway and Seno Skyring. A broader channel, Smyth Channel, leads north from the strait between Muñoz Gamero Peninsula and Manuel Rodriguez Island. Francisco Coloane Coastal and Marine Protected Area, a sanctuary for humpback whales, is located in this area. This part of the strait lies on the elongated Magallanes-Fagnano Fault, which marks a plate boundary between the South American Plate and the Scotia Plate. This fault continues southward under Almirantazgo Fjord and then below Fagnano Lake. Possibly, new tourism industries could be established in the eastern part of the strait for watching southern right whales, as the number of observations in the area has increased in recent years.

On the Atlantic side, the strait is characterized by semidiurnal macrotides with mean and spring tide ranges of 7.1 and 9.0 m, respectively. On the Pacific side, tides are mixed and mainly semidiurnal, with mean and spring tide ranges of 1.1 and 1.2 m, respectively. There is enormous tidal energy potential in the strait. The strait is prone to Williwaws, "a sudden violent, cold, katabatic gust of wind descending from a mountainous coast of high latitudes to the sea".

Place names
The place names of the area around the strait come from a variety of languages. Many are from Spanish and English, and several are from the Ona language, adapted to Spanish phonology and spelling. Examples include Timaukel (a hamlet at the east side of Tierra del Fuego), Carukinka (the end of the Almirantazgo Fjord), Anika (a channel located at 54° 7' S and 70° 30' W), and Arska (the north side of the Dawson Island).

Magellan named the strait Todos los Santos, as he began his voyage through the strait on November 1, 1520, the day of "All Saints" (Todos los Santos in Spanish). Charles V renamed it Estrecho de Magallanes. Magellan named the island on the south side of the strait Tierra del Fuego, which the Yaghan people called Onaisín in the Yaghan language. Magellan also gave the name Patagones to the mainland Indians, and their land was subsequently known as Patagonia.

Bahía Cordes is named for the Dutch pirate Baltazar de Cordes.

Lighthouses in the strait

The National Geospatial-Intelligence Agency lists 41 lighthouses in the waterway. Some of them are more than a century old, and some are declared Monumento Nacional ("national monument"). Among the most notable lighthouses are: County of Peebles hulk, the world's first four-masted, iron-hulled "full-rig ship", used now as a breakwater for the harbour at Punta Arenas; the San Isidro lighthouse, restored in 2004 and is now a museum and lodge; and the Evangelistas Lighthouse, located at the western mouth of the strait and built by George Slight, who wrote on his arrival in 1934:

This strait is one of the region's most popular tourist destinations. Several cruise companies ply its waters, and the lighthouses, including Magdalena Island Light, are popular attractions.

Environment

Numerous protected systems are located around the strait (S.P.: Sistema Protegido; B.N.P: Bienes Nacionales Protegidos):

B.N.P. Isla Carlos III
B.N.P. Islote Rupert
S.P. Cabo Espíritu Santo
S.P. Cabo Froward
S.P. Cabo Posesión
S.P. Estepa Húmeda Kampenaiken Tres Chorrillos
S.P. Isla Dawson
S.P. Península Muñoz Gamero
S.P. Reservas Biológicas de Río Cóndor
S.P. San Gregorio
S.P. San Juan
S.P. Timaukel

Traffic

The strait provides a well-protected inland waterway sheltered from rough weather and high seas, allowing for safe navigation. Ships sail through the strait from the Pacific to the Atlantic and back, from the oceans to the Beagle Channel through the Magdalena Channel, Cockburn Channel, Paso Brecknock or Canal Ocasión, Ballenero Channel, O'Brien Channel, Paso Timbales, northwest arm of the Beagle Channel and the Beagle Channel and back, and also to cross the strait from north to south and back. This is the case for all traffic between the Chile and Argentina and the cities in Tierra del Fuego, Porvenir, Cerro Sombrero, Timaukel, Ushuaia, and Río Grande.

In 2008, 571 Chilean ships and 1,681 non-Chilean ships sailed through the strait. Piloting is compulsory for sailing the strait. As one authority notes, "The Pilotage Regulations of the Chilean Hydrographic and Oceanographic Service ('the Regulations") provide that pilotage through the Magellan Strait is compulsory", with limited exceptions for local traffic. Who pays the fees for the pilot is subject to interpretation, however.

Navigation status

Article 35 of the United Nations Convention on the Law of the Sea states that "Nothing in this Part affects: ... the legal regime in straits in which passage is regulated in whole or in part by long-standing international conventions in force specifically relating to such straits". Article V of the Boundary treaty of 1881 between Chile and Argentina established a legal regime for the Strait of Magellan, and in a diplomatic letter to major shipping nations in 1873, Chile promised freedom of navigation through and neutrality within the strait.

Notable events
Joshua Slocum was the first documented person to have single-handedly sailed the strait. He experienced a 40-day hiatus in the strait due to storms and adverse weather, while piloting the gaff-rigged sloop oyster boat Spray in the first solo global circumnavigation. He wrote about the experience in Sailing Alone Around the World.

In 1976, American open water swimmer Lynn Cox became the first person to swim across the strait. Almost 40 years later, on January 17, 2014, Hunter Wright became the youngest person to swim across the strait at age 17.

In June 2004, the USS Ronald Reagan was the first nuclear-powered aircraft carrier to navigate the strait.

Gallery

See also

Agostini Fjord
Archipelagoes of Patagonia
Bahía Posesión
Beaver eradication in Tierra del Fuego
Cape Route
Continental Divide of the Americas
Exploration of the Pacific
Fjords and channels of Chile
Geography of Chile
Islands of Chile
List of Antarctic and subantarctic islands
List of fjords, channels, sounds and straits of Chile
List of islands of Chile
List of things named after Ferdinand Magellan
Magallanes Region
Monte Sarmiento
Punta Arenas
Timeline of the Magellan–Elcano circumnavigation
Transit passage

Footnotes

References

Bibliography

 Based on the 1601 English translation, sub ann. 1428.

Further reading

Parr, Charles McKew (1953) So Noble a Captain: The Life and Times of Ferdinand Magellan New York: Thomas Y. Crowell.

External links

The First Map of the Strait of Magellan, 1520 from 1800 
Map of the Strait of Magellan and Part of the Land of Fire, Prepared in 1786  via World Digital Archive

Nov 1 1520 to Nov 28 1520 Ferdinand Magellan discovers and explores Strait of Magellan World History Project
Satellite image, Strait of Magellan via Google Maps
United States Hydrographic Office, South America Pilot (1916)

 
Magellan
Bodies of water of Magallanes Region